Adam, also known by his Chinese name Jingjing, was an 8th-century Syriac Christian monk and scholar in China. He composed the text on the Nestorian Stele, which described the history of the Church of the East in China from 635 to 781. Many scholars believe he is also the author of the later Jingjiao Documents.

Biography 
Scholars place Adam's probable birth at around 750 or 751. Adam's father was named Yazedbozid (Syriac:  ,), who was part of a fighting unit invited to come to China by the Tang court to help quell the An Lushan Rebellion. According to the Syriac text on the stele, Adam's grandfather was named Mailas, and was a priest from Balkh in Tokharistan, in northern Afghanistan. It has been posited that Adam was raised or born in China and received a Chinese education due to his grasp of Classical Chinese and Chinese religious thought that's observed in his writings.

Nestorian stele
Around 781, Adam composed the Nestorian Stele. Sources also state that Adam translated (by imperial order) multiple Biblical texts into Chinese. The texts in question seemed to be paraphrases of certain portions of the New Testament and to a smaller extent, parts of the Old Testament. In 786, Adam helped an Indian Buddhist monk from Kapisha called Prajna translate the Buddhist text Sutra of the Six Mahayana Paramitas from an Iranian language (Sogdian or Bactrian) to Chinese. The translated text was presented to Emperor Dezong in 787, who rejected the translation on the grounds it was faulty, corrupted, and confused by a fusion of Buddhist and Nestorian concepts. 

Adam was bilingual in Persian and Chinese. He may also have been literate in Syriac, Arabic and possibly Sogdian or Bactrian.

References

Bibliography 

 Godwin, R. Todd (2018). Persian Christians at the Chinese Court: The Xi'an Stele and the Early Medieval Church of the East. Bloomsbury Publishing. .

8th-century Chinese people
8th-century Christian monks
Year of birth unknown
Year of death unknown
Place of birth unknown
Iranian Christians
Chinese people of Iranian descent